BCRS may refer to:

 Barycentric celestial reference system, a coordinate system used in astrometry to specify the location of astronomical objects
 Bureau of Clinician and Recruitment Service, a part of the United States Department of Health and Human Services